Mud on the Tires is the third studio album by American country music artist Brad Paisley. Released on July 22, 2003, through Arista Nashville, it produced four hit singles on the Billboard Hot Country Singles & Tracks (now Hot Country Songs) charts: the Top Five hits "Celebrity", "Little Moments" and "Whiskey Lullaby", as well as the Number One title track. The album itself has been certified 2× Platinum by the RIAA, while "Whiskey Lullaby" and the title-track have been certified as gold singles.

Content
The album produced four singles for Paisley. First was "Celebrity", which peaked at number 3 on the country charts. Following it were the number 2 "Little Moments", and then the number 3 "Whiskey Lullaby" in 2004. This latter song, a duet with Alison Krauss, was her first Top 40 country hit since her guest vocal on Kenny Rogers' Number One hit "Buy Me a Rose" in 2000. "Whiskey Lullaby" was later covered by Jon Randall, who co-wrote it, on his 2005 album Walking Among the Living. The title track was the fourth and final release from this album. In February 2005, this song became Paisley's fourth Number One hit.

"Is It Raining at Your House" is a cover of a song originally recorded by Vern Gosdin on his 1988 album Chiseled in Stone. Gosdin's rendition was a number 10 country hit that year. "Spaghetti Western Swing" is a narrative skit featuring Redd Volkaert. The final track is a hidden track called "Kung Pao", another skit featuring Bill Anderson, George Jones and "Little" Jimmy Dickens.

"The Cigar Song" is based on an urban legend about a man who purchases expensive cigars and takes out insurance on them, then smokes them and asks for the insurance money after claiming that they were lost in a "series of small fires".

Track listing

Personnel

Musicians
 Brad Paisley – lead vocals, acoustic guitar (1-4, 6-11, 13, 15, 16), electric guitars (1-8, 10-16), tic-tac bass (1-5, 7), 12-string guitar (2), mandolin (2, 6, 10), Go-bro (6), baritone guitar (9), 6-string bass guitar (11)
 Bernie Herms – acoustic piano (3, 4, 5, 8, 10, 13-16), Hammond B3 organ (6)
 Gordon Mote – Hammond B3 organ (4, 11)
 Jim "Moose" Brown – Hammond B3 organ (7)
 Gary Hooker – electric guitar (14), tic-tac bass (14)
 Redd Volkaert – electric guitar (15)
 Ron Block – banjo (1, 7, 10)
 Randle Currie – steel guitar (1, 2, 4, 5, 7, 8, 11, 13-16), pedabro (3)
 Jerry Douglas – dobro (9, 10)
 Kevin Grantt – bass guitar (1, 2, 4, 5, 7, 8, 10, 11, 14, 15, 16), upright bass (3, 9, 13), fretless bass (6), tic-tac bass (8)
 Ben Sesar – drums (1, 2, 4, 5, 6, 8, 9, 10, 13-16)
 Randy Hardison – drums (7)
 Eric Darken – percussion (1-11, 13-16), handclaps (8)
 Frank Rogers – handclaps (8)
 Brian David Willis – handclaps (8)
 Justin Williamson – fiddle (1-5, 8, 9, 11, 13, 14, 16)
 Alison Krauss – viola (9), lead and harmony vocals (9)
 Don Sampson – whistling (3)
 Wes Hightower – backing vocals (1-8, 10, 11, 14)
 Dan Aykroyd – backing vocals (5)
 Jim Belushi – backing vocals (5)
 Vince Gill – backing vocals (8)
 Kenny Lewis – backing vocals (9), bass guitar (10)
 Dan Tyminski – backing vocals (9)

Fingersnaps on "Ain't Nothin' Like"
 Darrell Hayes, Morgane Hayes, Jessica Rogers, Don Sampson and Wynn Varble

Children's Chorus on "Ain't Nothin' Like"
 Charles NcCallie, Manny Rogers, Emma Sampson, Maddie Sampson and Georgia Claire Varble

Chorus on "Farther Along"
 Neal Cappellino, Vince Gill, Wes Hightower, Valerie Pringle, Frank Rogers, Steve Short and Brian David Willis

Production
 Frank Rogers – producer, digital editing
 Richard Barrow – recording, digital editing
 Brian David Willis – recording, digital editing
 Justin Niebank – mixing
 Neal Cappellino – additional recording, digital editing
 Jason Lehning – additional recording
 Kendal Marcy – additional recording
 Steve Short – recording assistant, mix assistant
 Drew Bollman – mix assistant
 Adam Hatley – digital editing
 Ronnie Thomas – additional digital editing
 Hank Williams – mastering
 C. A. Dreyer – production assistant
 Astrid Hebrold May – art direction, design 
 Russ Harrington – photography

Chart performance

Weekly charts

Year-end charts

Certifications

References

2003 albums
Albums produced by Frank Rogers (record producer)
Arista Records albums 
Brad Paisley albums